The 1949–50 season was Newport County's third consecutive season in the Third Division South since relegation from the Second Division at the end of the 1946–47 season. The club finished in a re-election place, but since the division was being expanded by two clubs they were re-elected without a vote.

Season review

Results summary

Results by round

Fixtures and results

Third Division South

FA Cup

Welsh Cup

League table

Note: As the division was being expanded by two clubs, Newport County and Millwall were re-elected without a vote.

External links
 Newport County 1949-1950 : Results
 Newport County football club match record: 1950
 Welsh Cup 1949/50

References

 Amber in the Blood: A History of Newport County. 

1949-50
English football clubs 1949–50 season
1949–50 in Welsh football